Debreceni Egyetemi Atlétikai Club is a professional sport club based in Debrecen, Hajdú-Bihar County, Hungary, that competes in the Nemzeti Bajnokság II, the second tier of Hungarian football.

History
Debreceni EAC competed in the 2019–20 Nemzeti Bajnokság III.

On 3 July 2019, Elemér Kondás was appointed as the manager of the club.

On 3 December 2019, Kondás resigned because he received an offer from Győri ETO FC

On 15 January 2020, László Schőn was appointed as the manager of the club.

The 2019-20 Nemzeti Bajnokság III was terminated in May 2020 due to the COVID-19 pandemic. The club was positioned in the first place thus gaining promotion to the Nemzeti Bajnokság II. On 6 May 2020, it was announced that the club would play in the 2020-21 Nemzeti Bajnokság II.

On 8 May 2020, it was announced that the club could play their home matches at the Debreceni VSC's Nagyerdei Stadion.

Naming history
1919 – 1948: Debreceni Egyetemi Athletikai Club
1948– merger with Debreceni ASE
1948 – 1949: Debreceni MEFESz SE
1949 – 1951: Debreceni Egyetemi SE
1951 – 1957: Debreceni Haladás SK
1957 – ?: Debreceni Egyetemi Atlétikai Club
1979: merger with Debreceni ASE
1979– 1989: Debreceni Universitas SE
1991–present: Debreceni Egyetemi Atlétikai Club

Current squad

Managers
 Elemér Kondás (3 July 2019 – 3 December 2019)
 László Schőn (15 January 2020 – present)

External links
 Profile on Magyar Futball

References

Football clubs in Hungary
Association football clubs established in 1919
1919 establishments in Hungary
Sports clubs in Debrecen
University of Debrecen